China National Highway 216 (G216) is a highway in Xinjiang and Tibet, China. With the 2013 National Highway Network Plan, the route was extended north to Hongzhanzui in Fuhai County on the border with Mongolia, and extended south to the boundary with Nepal in Gyirong County. Originally it ran in the general southern direction from Altay City, Xinjiang to Baluntai (in Hejing County, Xinjiang), where it joins China National Highway 218. It was originally 857  kilometres in length. After landslides blocked Zhangmu port of entry, for a while, G216 was the only road link between Nepal and Tibet.

Route and distance

See also
 China National Highways

References

External links
Official website of Ministry of Transport of PRC

216
Transport in Xinjiang

Transport in Tibet